"Someone Like You" is a 1986 dance single by Sylvester.  The song was written by Len Barry and McKinley Horton. It was produced by Ken Kessie and Morey Goldstein. The single was Sylvester's second and last entry to reach number one on the dance charts, where it stayed for one week.  "Someone like You", also went to number nineteen on the soul chart, and was Sylvester's highest chart entry, since 1978.

The single sleeve was designed by artist Keith Haring.

Track listing
US 7" single
"Someone Like You" - 4:10
"Someone Like You" (Larry Levan mix) - 4:30

US 12" Maxi-Single
"Someone Like You" - 6:11
"Someone Like You" (Joseph Watt remix) - 5:46
"Someone Like You" (Larry Levan mix) - 5:58
"Someone Like You (Dub)" (Larry Levan mix) - 6:35

References

1986 singles
1986 songs
Sylvester (singer) songs
Songs written by Len Barry
Warner Records singles
Singles with cover art by Keith Haring